Guṇa is a Hindu philosophical concept.

Guna or Gunas may also refer to:

Places
 Guna district, in Madhya Pradesh, India
 Guna, India, the capital city of the Guna District
 Guna Junction railway station
 Guna (Lok Sabha constituency)
 Guna (Vidhan Sabha constituency)
 Mount Guna, a shield volcano in Ethiopia
 Guna (woreda), a district of Ethiopia

Other uses
 Guṇa (Jainism), the corresponding concept in Jainism
 Guna people, indigenous peoples of Panama and Colombia
 Guna (film) or Gunaa, a 1991 Indian Tamil-language psychological romance
 Guna Airlines, a former airline based in Nepal 
 Guna (knife), a Visayan agricultural knife

See also
 Guna Yala, an indigenous province in northeast Panama
 Günəş, a municipality in Beylagan Rayon, Azerbaijan